Boína blanca is a 1941 Argentine drama film directed  and written by Luis Moglia Barth based on the script by Carlos Goicochea and Rogelio Cordone.

Cast
 Luis Aldás 
 Fernando Caprio 
 Alba Castellanos 
 Carlos Castro 
 Ada Cornaro 
 Rufino Córdoba 
 Nicolás Fregues 
 Elisa Labardén 
 Inés Murray 
 Sabina Olmos 
 José Otal 
 Benita Puértolas 
 Froilán Varela 
 Francisco Álvarez

References

External links
 

1941 films
1940s Spanish-language films
Argentine black-and-white films
Films directed by Luis Moglia Barth
Argentine drama films
1941 drama films
1940s Argentine films